De La Porte is a surname. Notable people with the surname include:

Arnaud I de La Porte ( 1706–1770)
Arnaud II de La Porte (1737–1792)
Elizabeth de la Porte (1941–2020), South African harpsichordist
Charles de La Porte (1602–1664), French nobleman and general
Regnaud de La Porte (died 1325), French bishop and cardinal

See also
Delaporte
Laporte (disambiguation)